Rainbow Cave may refer to:
Rainbow Cave (Iowa County, Wisconsin), from the National Register of Historic Places listings in Iowa County, Wisconsin
Rainbow Cave (Makapansgat, South Africa)
Rainbow Cave (Western Australia)
Keshet Cave, Israel